Squadron Leader Rajeshwar Prasad Bidhuri (10 February 1945 – 11 June 2000), also known as Rajesh Pilot was an Indian politician, a minister in the Government of India and a former Indian Air Force officer. He belonged to the Indian National Congress party and represented the Dausa constituency in Lok Sabha. His original name was Rajesh Bidhuri. Rajesh Pilot died on 11 June 2000 in a car crash near Jaipur.

Early life and air force career 
Rajeshwar Prasad Bidhuri was born in Baidpura Village in present day Greater Noida and was a member of the Bidhuri Gujjar community. He was respected from an early age as he was admitted to Indian Air Force, which was an outstanding achievement in rural India. Rajeshwar Prasad, was commissioned in the General Duties (Pilot) branch of the Indian Air Force as a pilot officer on 29 October 1966. He was promoted to flying officer on 29 October 1967 and to flight lieutenant on 29 October 1971. He fought in the Indo-Pakistan War of 1971 as a bomber pilot, flying a modified de Havilland Canada DHC-4 Caribou. He was promoted to squadron leader on 29 October 1977. On 8 August 1978, he was seconded to the Ministry of Agriculture.

In late 1979, Prasad resigned his commission while posted in Jaisalmer to join politics, under the influence of his friend Rajiv Gandhi, who later became the Prime Minister of India. He contested the 1980 Lok Sabha elections as an INC candidate from Bharatpur, changing his surname to Pilot at the same time.

In politics
Pilot emerged as a prominent Gujjar leader in India. In his first election as a candidate, Pilot defeated the former queen of Bharatpur State.

On an official visit to the Netherlands in 1988, his Dutch counterpart, learning Pilot was a former IAF officer, arranged for him to fly a RNLAF F-16; the IAF subsequently invited Pilot to test a new MiG-29 following his return to India.

He sent Chandraswami to prison when he was the Internal Security Minister. Later, he lost the election for the post of Congress president to Sitaram Kesri, but remained in the first line of Congress leaders.

Rajesh Pilot died on 11 June 2000 in a car crash near Jaipur.

India Post has issued a commemorative postage stamp of  ₹5.00 on 11 June 2008.

In New Delhi and Gurgaon, a road has been named in his honour. In Rewari, a roundabout has been named after him in his honour.

Political career

Medals

References

2000 deaths
Rajasthani politicians
Rajasthani people
People from Ghaziabad, Uttar Pradesh
Road incident deaths in India
1945 births
India MPs 1980–1984
India MPs 1984–1989
India MPs 1991–1996
India MPs 1996–1997
India MPs 1998–1999
Lok Sabha members from Rajasthan
Indian National Congress politicians from Rajasthan
India MPs 1999–2004
People from Dausa district
Accidental deaths in India
Indian aviators
Indian Air Force officers
Indian Hindus
Indian military personnel of the Indo-Pakistani War of 1971